The 1994 Currie Cup (known as the Bankfin Currie Cup for sponsorship reasons) was the 56th season in the South African Currie Cup competition since it started in 1889.

Competition

Regular season and title playoffs
There were 6 participating teams in the 1994 Currie Cup. These teams played each other twice over the course of the season, once at home and once away.

Teams received two points for a win and one points for a draw.

The top two teams qualified for the final.

Teams

Changes from 1993
None.

Team Listing

Log

Matches

Round 1

Round 2

Round 3

Round 4

Round 5

Round 6

Round 7

Round 8

Round 9

Round 10

Round 11

Round 12

Final

External links
 Currie Cup Log 1994
 

 
1994 in South African rugby union
Currie